The Drought Relief Service (DRS) was a federal agency of the U.S. New Deal formed in 1935 to coordinate relief activities in response to the Dust Bowl. It purchased cattle at risk of starvation due to drought.

History
"Four extensive droughts developed in the Great Plains area between 1930 and 1940, causing widespread dust storms, agricultural failure, poverty, unemployment and devastation to the nation's economy." The drought in 1934 was described as "the worst ever in U.S. history, covering more than 75 percent of the country and affecting 27 states severely."

The DRS bought cattle in counties which were designated emergency areas, where cattle were in danger of starvation due to drought. The prices paid ranged from $14 to $20 a head. Animals unfit for human consumption – more than 50 percent at the beginning of the program – were killed. The remaining cattle were given to the Federal Surplus Relief Corporation (FSRC) to be used in food distribution to families nationwide.

A Texan describes the story passed down in his family:

On August 7, 1934 the following New York Times headline illustrated the extent of the program:

Although it was difficult for farmers to give up their herds, the cattle slaughter program helped many of them avoid bankruptcy. "The government cattle buying program was a God-send to many farmers, as they could not afford to keep their cattle, and the government paid a better price than they could obtain in local markets."

References

Further reading
 

New Deal agencies
United States Department of Agriculture agencies
Droughts in the United States
Meat processing in the United States
Cattle in the United States
1935 establishments in the United States
Government agencies established in 1935